Lamprosema caradocalis is a moth in the family Crambidae. It was described by Schaus in 1927. It is found in Peru.

References

Moths described in 1927
Moths of South America
Lamprosema